The Meursault Investigation is the first novel by Algerian writer and journalist Kamel Daoud.  It is a retelling of Albert Camus' 1942 novel, The Stranger. First published in Algeria by Barzakh Editions  in October 2013, it was reissued in France by Actes Sud (May 2014). Its publication in France was followed by nominations for many prizes and awards.

Relationship to Camus' The Stranger
Meursault, the protagonist of Albert Camus' novel The Stranger, murders a character known only as "the Arab", saying, in his trial, that the murder was a meaningless gesture caused by sunstroke or God's absence. Camus left Meursault's victim nameless, but Kamel Daoud gives him a name: Musa. The Meursault Investigation revisits these events, but from the point of view of Harun, Musa's brother.

Giving a name to Meursault's nameless victim, for Daoud, is about more than just revisiting a minor character. In an interview with the Los Angeles Review of Books, Daoud said: "Ever since the Middle Ages, the white man has the habit of naming Africa and Asia's mountains and insects, all the while denying the names of the human beings they encounter. By removing their names, they render banal murder and crimes. By claiming your own name, you are also making a claim of your humanity and thus the right to justice."

In the same interview, when asked what prompted him to write the book, Daoud stressed the centrality of The Stranger to his identity as an Algerian Francophone writer. In other outlets, Daoud has confirmed the integral role that The Stranger played in the genesis of The Meursault Investigation, describing his novel as "a dialogue with Camus."

Another of Camus's novels, The Fall, is referenced in Daoud's book through the narrative style.

Critical reception
After the book was translated into English by John Cullen and published by Other Press in 2015, it received positive reviews in the English-language publications. Azadeh Moaveni, writing for the Financial Times, called it "perhaps the most important novel to emerge out of the Middle East in recent memory."
Writing for the New York Times Book Review, Laila Lalami described it as Daoud's "rich and inventive new novel." 
Michiko Kakutani called it "stunning." In April 2015, an excerpt of The Meursault Investigation was featured in The New Yorker.

Religious controversy in Algeria
On December 16, 2014, a death threat against Daoud was issued from a Facebook page that is now locked. Abdelfattah Hamadache, the radical Islamist preacher who issued the fatwa, leads a Salafist group called the Islamic Awakening Front. Hamadache has labeled Daoud an apostate, "an enemy of religion," a "deviant creature" and a "collaborator." He called on the Algerian state to execute Daoud, on the grounds that he is leading a "war against God and the prophet."

Daoud has filed a complaint for incitement with the ministry of religious affairs. Various individuals and groups have also signed petitions and published open letters in support of Daoud.

Honors and awards
Meursault, contre-enquête won the 2015 Goncourt first novel prize, the 2014 Prix François-Mauriac and the 2014 Prix des cinq continents de la Francophonie. It was shortlisted for the 2014 Goncourt prize.

References

External links
 Daoud, Kamel. Translated into English by John Cullen. "Musa" (Archive). New Yorker. April 6, 2015. Retrieved on December 7, 2015.

2013 novels
Algerian novels
French-language novels
Parallel literature
Albert Camus
Other Press books